Michael Horodniceanu (born Mihai Horodniceanu;  August 4, 1944) is a Romanian American engineer and the former traffic commissioner of New York City. He was also the president of MTA Capital Construction.  

Horodniceanu was born in Bucharest, Romania, and emigrated to Israel at age 16. He served in the military there and graduated from Technion. 

Horodniceanu has a BCE from the Israel Institute of Technology; an MS in Engineering Management from Coilumbia University, and a Ph.D. in Transportation Planning and Engineering from Polytechnic Institute of New York University now NYU Tandon School of Engineering. .

In 1970 he came to the U.S. with his family. He founded the Urbitran Group in 1973, being CEO from 1980 to 1986 and 1990 to 2008. From 1986 to 1990 he was traffic commissioner in New York City, where he oversaw $18 billion for "Metropolitan Transportation Authority’s mega projects". He taught transportation planning, highway design, traffic engineering, transportation financing, and system safety as a full-time professor in both the undergraduate and graduate schools of Polytechnic Institute of New York University (NYU-POLY) and Manhattan College. He is a former engineer-in-chief of the MTA.

References

1944 births
20th-century American businesspeople
20th-century American engineers
21st-century American businesspeople
21st-century American engineers
American people of Romanian-Jewish descent
Businesspeople from New York City
Engineers from New York (state)
Israeli emigrants to the United States
Living people
Manhattan College faculty
Metropolitan Transportation Authority
Polytechnic Institute of New York University alumni
Polytechnic Institute of New York University faculty
Romanian emigrants to Israel
Romanian emigrants to the United States
Romanian people of Israeli descent